Balázs Szöllősi (born 24 October 1992) is a Hungarian handballer who plays for Balatonfüredi KSE and the Hungarian national team.

References

External links
Oregfiuk.hu
Tatabanyahandball.com

1992 births
Living people
Hungarian male handball players
People from Veszprém
Sportspeople from Veszprém County